Guzhen County is a county in the north of Anhui Province, China. It is under the administration of Bengbu city.

Administrative divisions
In the present, Guzhen County has 8 towns and 3 townships.
8 Towns

3 Townships
 Shihu
 Yangmiao
 Zhongxing

Climate

History 
 A 4500 year old city in what is called as the Nanchengzi Ruins is found in this county.
 At the end of the Qin Dynasty (202 BC), the battle of Chu and Han happened in Guzhen, leaving the "besieged on all sides", "Farewell My Concubine" and other stories.
 During Taihe Period, the Northern Wei Dynasty, establish a town called Guyang, then evolve Guzhen County.
 October 31, 1964, each part of Xuxian, Lingbi, Huaiyuan, Wuhe formed the Administrative Region Establishment of Guzhen County. July 1, 1965, Guzhen county was  under the administration of Xuxian area; 1983 is Bengbu City.

Place of interest 
 Gaixia ruins (the provincial cultural relics protection units)
 Yangcheng Valley site
 Ancient battlefield site

References

Bengbu